Willy Seewald (5 October 1900 – 2 February 1929) was a Brazilian athlete. He competed in the men's javelin throw at the 1924 Summer Olympics.

References

External links
 

1900 births
1929 deaths
Athletes (track and field) at the 1924 Summer Olympics
Brazilian male javelin throwers
Olympic athletes of Brazil
Place of birth missing